The Chestnut Ridge Historical Area contains a number of the oldest buildings on the University of Massachusetts Amherst campus in the US, including its iconic chapel, the campus war memorial, the W. E. B. Du Bois Library and the last remaining barn from the founding years of the Massachusetts Agricultural College.

Historical buildings
 Blaisdell House
 Curry Hicks Cage
 Goodell Hall
 Grinnell Hall
 Horse Barn
 Memorial Hall
 Munson Hall
 Munson Annex
 Old Chapel
 South College

Other buildings
 Bartlett Hall
 Fine Arts Center
 Machmer Hall
 Student Union
 Thompson Hall
 Tobin Hall
 W. E. B. Du Bois Library

Former buildings
 Dairy Barn Complex
 Liberal Arts Annex
 North College

External links
 2007 Legacy Buildings Report

University of Massachusetts Amherst buildings